
Year 774 (DCCLXXIV) was a common year starting on Saturday (link will display the full calendar) of the Julian calendar. The denomination 774 for this year has been used since the early medieval period, when the Anno Domini calendar era became the prevalent method in Europe for naming years.

Events 
 By place 
 Byzantine Empire 
 Battle of Berzitia: The Bulgarian ruler (khagan) Telerig sends a small raiding army (12,000 men) to strike into the southwest of Macedonia, and capture Berzitia. Emperor Constantine V is informed about this raid by his spies in Pliska, and assembles an enormous force (80,000 men). He surprises the Bulgarians, who did not expect to find a Byzantine army there, and defeats them decisively. The Bulgars suffer heavy losses.
 Telerig sends a message to Constantine V, stating that he is going to flee in exile to Constantinople. In exchange, he asks the emperor to reveal the spies to his associates in Pliska for their own safety. Constantine sends the Bulgarian government a list of the spies; however, Telerig executes them all, and eliminates the Byzantine spy network within his government.

 Europe 
 King Charlemagne conquers the Lombard Kingdom, and establishes Frankish rule in Pavia, Venetia, Istria, Emilia, Tuscany, and Corsica. Charlemagne visits Rome; he confirms the Donation of Pepin (see 756) while insisting on his own sovereignty. Pope Adrian I grants him the title of patrician. Charlemagne puts down immediate insurrections in Friuli. 
 June – King Desiderius surrenders the independence of the Lombards to the Franks, and is exiled to Corbie Abbey (Picardy). Charlemagne annexes northern Italy as a sub-kingdom, and takes the title of Rex Langobardorum. Some Lombards flee south to Benevento, which remains independent; Duke Arechis II retitles himself "Prince of Benevento". 
 Saxon Wars: Saxon raiders ravage much of northern Hesse (modern Germany), and burn the abbey at Fritzlar, putting the abbot and monks to the sword. Charlemagne hurriedly returns to Austrasia, assembles local troops, and recaptures Eresburg, before the approach of winter halts further operations. 
 King Aurelius dies after a 6-year reign, and is succeeded by his cousin-in-law Silo, as ruler of Asturias (Northern Spain).

 Britain 
 Unrest in the Northumbrian Church appears to lead to the expulsion of King Alhred, who is driven from his capital York. He sails from Bamburgh into exile amongst the Picts, where he is received by King Ciniod I. He is replaced by Æthelred I, the 11-year-old son of the late king Æthelwald Moll.
 King Offa of Mercia subdues the Anglo-Saxon kingdoms of Kent and Wessex (approximate date).

 By topic 
 Astronomy 

Births 
 Kūkai, Japanese Buddhist monk (d. 835)

Deaths 
date unknown
 Abd al-Rahman al-Awza'i, Muslim scholar (b. 707)
 Abu Mikhnaf, Muslim historian (approximate date)
 Amoghavajra, Chinese translator (b. 705)
 Kim Daeseong, Korean minister (b. 700)
 Aurelius, king of Asturias (Spain)
probable
 Gummarus, Frankish nobleman and saint (b. 717)
 Krishna I, ruler of the Rashtrakuta Empire

References